HMS Canada was a 74-gun third-rate ship of the line of the Royal Navy, launched on 17 September 1765 at Woolwich Dockyard.

On 2 May 1781, Canada engaged and captured the Spanish ship , of 34 guns.

In 1782, Canada was under the command of William Cornwallis, when she took part in the Battle of St. Kitts. Later that year she participated in the Battle of the Saintes.

She took part in the action of 6 November 1794 under Charles Powell Hamilton and managed to avoid capture.

Napoleonic Wars
In 1807, Canada was in the Caribbean in a squadron under the command of Rear-Admiral Alexander Cochrane.

Following the concern in Britain that neutral Denmark was entering an alliance with Napoleon, in December 1807 Canada sailed in Cochrane's squadron in the expedition to occupy the Danish West Indies. The expedition captured the Danish islands of St Thomas on 22 December and Santa Cruz on 25 December. The Danes did not resist and the invasion was bloodless.

Fate
Canada became a prison ship from 1810, and was broken up in 1834.

Notes

References

Lavery, Brian (2003) The Ship of the Line - Volume 1: The development of the battlefleet 1650–1850. Conway Maritime Press. .
Michael Phillips. Ships of the Old Navy, A History of Ships of the 18th Century Royal Navy. Ships of the Old Navy. Retrieved 2 June 2007.

External links
 

Ships of the line of the Royal Navy
Canada-class ships of the line
1765 ships
Prison ships
Maritime incidents in 1796